The Museum of Science (MoS) is a science museum and indoor zoo in Boston, Massachusetts, located in Science Park, a plot of land spanning the Charles River. Along with over 700 interactive exhibits, the museum features a number of live presentations throughout the building every day, along with shows at the Charles Hayden Planetarium and the Mugar Omni Theater, the only domed IMAX screen in New England. The museum is also an accredited member of the Association of Zoos and Aquariums (AZA) and is home to over 100 animals, many of which have been rescued and rehabilitated.

History

Origin and early years
The museum began as the Boston Society of Natural History in 1830, founded by a collection of men who wished to share scientific interests. Their first meeting was held on February 9, 1830 with seven original members in attendance: Walter Channing, Benjamin D. Greene, George Hayward, John Ware, Edward Brooks, Amos Binney, and George B. Emerson. It was more commonly called the Boston Museum of Natural History in the 19th century, and this name occurs frequently in the literature. In 1862, after the society had gone through several temporary facilities, a building was constructed in the Back Bay area of the city and dubbed the New England Museum of Natural History. The museum was located next to the original Rogers Building of the Massachusetts Institute of Technology (MIT), and both neoclassical structures were designed by William G. Preston.  The original MIT building was demolished in 1939, but the Natural History Museum building survives today, as a home furnishings showcase.

A great deal of scientific work was done by the society, especially around geology, and the results of this work can be found in the Proceedings of the Boston Society of Natural History which are now freely available online.  A library and children's rooms were added to the museum around 1900. It was renamed the Museum of Science in 1939, under the directorship of Henry Bradford Washburn, Jr., a renowned American mountaineer.

The Boston Museum of Natural History of 1830/1864–1945 should not be confused with the private Warren Museum of Natural History (1858–1906, formerly on Chestnut Street in Boston).  The contents of the latter collection, including the first intact mastodon, were relocated to the American Museum of Natural History of New York City in 1906.

Museum Then and Now, an exhibit of artifacts from the early years of the society, is located near the second floor Blue Wing entrance to the Theater of Electricity in today's museum.

Post WWII
After World War II, the old Museum of Science building was sold, and the museum was relocated, again under the name Boston Museum of Science. Under the leadership of Bradford Washburn, the society negotiated with the Metropolitan District Commission for a 99-year lease of the land on the Charles River Dam Bridge, now known as Science Park. The museum pays $1 a year to the state for use of the land. Construction and development began in 1948, and the museum opened in 1951, arguably the first all-encompassing science museum in the country.

In these first few years, the museum developed a traveling planetarium, a version of which is still brought to many elementary schools in the Greater Boston area every year. They also obtained during these early years "Spooky", a great horned owl who became a symbol or mascot of the museum; he lived to age 38, the longest any great horned owl is known to have lived.  Today, a number of other taxidermed specimens remain on display, teaching children about the animals of New England and of the world.

The Science Park/West End MBTA infill station was opened in August 1955, allowing easier access to the museum by public transportation. The Charles Hayden Planetarium was opened in 1958.

Many more expansions continued into the 1970s and 1980s. In 1999, The Computer Museum in Boston closed and became part of the Museum of Science, integrating some of its educational displays, although the most of the historical artifacts were moved to the Computer History Museum in Mountain View, California.

A major renovation and expansion took place during 2005 and 2006. In 2010, the Charles Hayden Planetarium was closed for renovation, and has since reopened.

The main entrance to the museum straddles the border between the cities of Boston and Cambridge, and the boundary is indicated by a marker embedded in the floor inside the museum. In 2013, the Museum of Science was the venue for the first joint session of the Boston and Cambridge city councils, to discuss policy measures to improve retention of talented recent university graduates in the area.

Future

Starting in 2013, the Museum of Science has been undergoing a major renovation to upgrade the physical structure and develop new educational content. This $250 million campaign will upgrade nearly half of the Exhibit Halls from 2012, and open three new major exhibits: the Hall of Human Life, the Yawkey Gallery on the Charles River, and What Is Technology? The Hall of Human Life opened in November 2013 in the newly expanded Level 2 of the Green Wing, and has a focus on human biology.  The audio kinetic sculpture Archimedean Excogitation has been moved to the atrium to make way for a new exhibit in the lower lobby called The Yawkey Gallery on the Charles River. This exhibit opened in 2016, creating a new entry to the museum with better views of the Charles River and Boston-Cambridge skyline.

On October 18, 2016 former mayor of New York City Michael Bloomberg revealed that his foundation, Bloomberg Philanthropies, is donating $50 million to the museum, the largest gift in the institution's 186-year history.

The museum also opened Wicked Smart: Invented in the Hub, an exhibition of new technologies, especially those created in or around the Boston area. This new exhibit also contains a few interactive activities, including a novel type of wheelchair which visitors can sit in and maneuver. A large-scale interactive digital video projection devised at the MIT Media Lab using sensors from an Xbox Kinect, is very popular with visitors, who can control complex visual displays by means of body gestures and motions.

Exhibit halls 

Blue Wing
 Butterfly Garden: a walk-through greenhouse containing exotic butterflies with an area dedicated to botanical education
 Seeing is Deceiving: a collection of optical illusions, including many motorized illusions
 Making Models: exhibit on the use of physical and abstract models to understand the real world
 Mathematica: A World of Numbers... and Beyond: a roomful of classic mathematical exhibits by designers Charles and Ray Eames
 Natural Mysteries: an investigative exhibit on classification of mysterious objects and natural history specimens
 Theater of Electricity: features the world's largest air-insulated Van de Graaff generator, designed by Professor Robert J. Van de Graaff and donated by MIT in 1956. Demonstrations of "artificial lightning bolts", Tesla coils, and other electrical apparatus
 Math Moves!: Experiencing Ratio and Proportion: an immersive exploration of math and proportion including the former exhibit, Clark Collection of Mechanical Movements: over 100 working models of mechanical motions and linkages
 Innovative Engineers: exhibits and brief biographies of Boston engineers, including minorities and women
 Investigate!: a house-sized collection of rooms to explore using scientific thinking
 Energize!: exhibits of renewable energy technologies
 Nanotechnology
 Mapping the World Around Us
 Take a Closer Look
 Dinosaurs: Modeling the Mesozoic: a collection of fossils and life-size models of dinosaurs and extinct animals, including a full-size Tyrannosaurus rex model
Colossal Fossil: Triceratops Cliff: a 65-million-year-old fossil, discovered in the Dakota Badlands in 2004
 Machines & Transportation
 Living on the Edge
 To the Moon
 Behind the Scenes
 Wicked Smart: Invented in the Hub

Green Wing
 New England Habitats
 A Bird's World
 Colby Room: a classic explorer's trophy room filled with stuffed animal heads from big-game hunting, preserved as a historical exhibit and also used for meetings
 Hall of Human Life: an exhibit of interactive activities focusing on human biology

Red Wing
 Mugar Omni Theater: largest Omnimax movie theater in New England
 Charles Hayden Planetarium
 Cosmic Light
 Discovery Center: offers the opportunity to talk with scientists and participate in experiments
 Foucault pendulum: shows the effect of the rotation of the Earth
 Museum Store
 Polage: a wall-sized polarized light collage of shapes by artist Austine Wood Comarow
 Soundstair: a stairway fitted by artist Christopher Janney with photoelectric cells which trigger musical sounds
 Archimedean Excogitation: a large rolling ball sculpture by George Rhoads
 Thrillride 360: Simulator ride

Miscellaneous
 Yawkey Gallery on the Charles River: an open area filled with information about the Charles River and river science in general
 The Rock Garden
The exterior stone panels on the facade were executed by Belmont sculptor Theodore Barbarossa.

Live presentations and programs

The museum offers many free live presentations to visitors, including hands-on demonstrations and live animal show-and-tell sessions.

The MoS has extensive educational programs from pre-school up through adult programming, including lecture series, concerts, films, workshops, and public policy discussions.

Special "overnight" programs invite students in grades 1–7, as well as Scout groups, to spend a night at the museum.

Engineering Design Workshop 
Engineering Design Workshop is an exhibit on the first level in the Blue Wing that sees about 200–800 visitors a day. It includes various different design challenges and other more one-on-one "cart activities" for visitors. The design center includes about a dozen activities for visitors to attempt while learning about the engineering process run twice a day from 10am-12pm and from 2pm–4pm during the school year, and also 4:30pm–6:30pm during the summer. The cart activities include robotics and circuitry and are more meant for teaching visitors about new technology. All activities also include a magnet for visitors who attempted the activities.

Notable past exhibits
 In the 1950s, a small Wilson cloud chamber was featured in the main entrance hall. Visitors could come within inches of radioactive material to watch the vapor trails of the particles they emitted.
 The first Fresnel lens using electricity in the US (removed from the Navesink lighthouse), was on display from the early 1950s until 1979.
 In 1988, the museum was host to an exhibit focusing on the life and times of Ramses II. The exhibit displayed more than 70 artifacts, on loan from the Egyptian Museum in Cairo. Arguably, the centerpiece of the exhibit was a 40-foot-tall model of an Egyptian temple which housed a 3,000-year-old, 57-ton granite statue of Ramses. The exhibit ran from May 7, 1988 through August 30, 1988.
 From August to October 2004, the museum was host to the US premiere of The Lord of the Rings the Motion Picture Trilogy the Exhibition, developed by the Te Papa museum in New Zealand, and containing many of the costumes and props from the films.
 The Museum of Science built and designed its own film-based exhibit, entitled Star Wars: Where Science Meets Imagination. It was on display there from October 2005 to April 2006, and traveled to other venues.
 Gunther von Hagens' Body Worlds 2: The Anatomical Exhibition of Real Human Bodies was at the Museum of Science from July 29, 2006 to January 7, 2007.
 From October 25, 2009 to February 21, 2010, Harry Potter: The Exhibition was at the museum.
 The Science Behind Pixar is a  exhibition currently on tour around the US. It was created by the Museum of Science, Boston, in collaboration with Pixar Animation Studios. This exhibit featured some of the activities, videos, and images that describe the math, computer science, and science that go into making computer animated films.

Computing exhibits

Although the history artifacts of The Computer Museum (TCM) were moved from Boston to Silicon Valley to become the core of the current Computer History Museum, some former TCM educational exhibits and objects were transferred to the Boston Museum of Science where two new computing and technology exhibits were created. The Computing Revolution, an exhibit no longer on display at the Museum of Science, related the history of computing through a variety of hands-on interactive exhibits. Cahners ComputerPlace, previously located in the Blue Wing, Level 1, housed displays ranging from educational video games to an interactive AIBO ERS-7 robot. The first integrated quantum computing system, developed by MOS Director of Strategic Projects Carol Lynn Albert in collaboration with IBM, is on display as part of MOS's computing exhibits.

Other attractions
 In 1997, the museum developed a permanent to-scale community Solar System model that physically spanned as far as the Riverside MBTA station (in Newton, Massachusetts). The bronze models of the Sun, Mercury, and Venus were located on the museum grounds. However, in 2015 several of the scale models were removed from their original locations, and their current status is unknown . The nearest known surviving scale model is a walkable  installation on the third floor of the Infinite Corridor at MIT.
 Construction began on a rooftop Wind Turbine Lab in 2009. The lab tests nine wind turbines from five different manufacturers on the roof of the museum. An exhibit in the Blue Wing, Catching the Wind, includes a live data stream on how much electricity each turbine is producing.

See also
 Boston Society of Natural History, predecessor to the museum
 Intel Computer Clubhouse Network, global after-school technology program headquartered at the museum

References

External links

 
 Current Exhibits & Reviews
 A science podcast from the Current Science & Technology Center
 Navesink lighthouse information from the National Park Service
 "Human Connections"  Video on the making of this large interactive polarized light mural, located in the atrium of the Mugar Imax Wing of the MOS (Artist: Austine Wood Comarow)
 MOS is a member of NISE Net, and participates in NanoDays

1830 establishments in Massachusetts
Association of Science-Technology Centers member institutions
Buildings and structures in Boston
Dinosaur museums in the United States
IMAX venues
Landmarks in Boston
Museums established in 1830
Museum of Science
Indoor zoos
Natural history museums in Massachusetts
Science museums in Massachusetts
Zoos in Massachusetts
Towers in Massachusetts
Wind power in Massachusetts